Point Lance is a town in the Canadian province of Newfoundland and Labrador.

In 2016, Point Lance Road was voted Worst Road in Atlantic Canada by the Canadian Automobile Association's Worst Roads list.

Demographics 

See also
 List of cities and towns in Newfoundland and Labrador

References 

Towns in Newfoundland and Labrador